Gurzelen Stadion was a multi-purpose stadium in Biel/Bienne, Switzerland.  It has mostly been used for football matches and was the home ground of FC Biel-Bienne.  The capacity of the stadium was 5,500. Gurzelen Stadion was set to be demolished in mid 2016. Gurzelen Stadion is temporarily used for the project "Terrain Gurzelen"  since January 2017 until it will be demolished the earliest in 2020.

See also
List of football stadiums in Switzerland

References

External links
Worldstadiums.com profile
Terrain Gurzelen

Football venues in the Canton of Bern
Biel/Bienne
Multi-purpose stadiums in Switzerland
Sports venues in the Canton of Bern
FC Biel-Bienne